Neurazy is a municipality and village in Plzeň-South District in the Plzeň Region of the Czech Republic. It has about 700 inhabitants.

Administrative parts
Villages of Klikařov, Nová Ves u Nepomuka, Partoltice, Radochovy, Soběsuky and Vojovice are administrative parts of Neurazy.

References

Villages in Plzeň-South District